The Karachi Agreement of 1949 was signed by the military representatives of India and Pakistan, supervised by the United Nations Commission for India and Pakistan, establishing a cease-fire line in Kashmir following the Indo-Pakistani War of 1947. It established a cease-fire line which has been monitored by United Nations observers from the United Nations since then.

Background

The Security Council Resolution 39 of April 1948 established a UN Commission (United Nations Commission for India and Pakistan — UNCIP) to mediate between India and Pakistan to bring about a cessation of fighting in Kashmir and to make arrangements for a popular plebiscite. After negotiations with the two sides, the Commission passed a three-part resolution in August 1948 and subsequently added a 'supplement'. The three parts dealt with ceasefire, terms for truce, and procedures for negotiation regarding the plebiscite. Both the countries accepted the resolution and a ceasefire was achieved on 31 December 1948.

Agreement

The Karachi Agreement formally called the Agreement Between Military Representatives of India and Pakistan Regarding the Establishment of a Cease-Fire Line in the State of Jammu and Kashmir, was signed on 27 July 1949, supervised by the Truce Subcommittee of the UNCIP.

The signatories were:
 Lt. Gen. S. M. Shrinagesh, on behalf of India
 Maj. Gen. W. J. Cawthorn, on behalf of Pakistan
 Hernando Samper and M. Delvoie, on behalf of the UNCIP.

The other members of the Indian delegation were Maj. Gen. K. S. Thimayya, Brig. Sam Manekshaw, Maj. S. K. Sinha (who acted as the aide-de-camp for Gen. Srinagesh), and the secretaries of the Defence Ministry and the Ministry of Kashmir Affairs. The Pakistani delegation included Maj. Gen. Nazir Ahmed and Brig. Sher Khan and civil servants M. Ayub and A. A. Khan. The military representatives of the two sides negotiated for a week starting 18 July to demarcate the positions under their control.

S. K. Sinha stated that the Prime Minister Jawaharlal Nehru briefed the Indian delegation before the Karachi meeting, wherein he informed them that the UN Resolution conceded the legality of Kashmir's accession to India and, so, any "no man's land" would belong to India. The Pakistani delegation would need to produce proof to the UN Commission of factual positions of their control for all the territory they claim. Sinha stated that, based on this principle, the agreement demarcated several hundred square miles of territory on the Indian side even though there were no Indian troops in that territory.

The 830 kilometre long ceasefire line established in the agreement started from a southernmost point just west of the Chenab river in Jammu. It ran in a rough arc northwards and then northeastwards to the map coordinate NJ9842, about 19 km north of the Shyok river.

From the map point NJ9842, it was said to run due north to the international boundary with China, at a distance of about 60–65 km. Since there were no troops in that area of inaccessible glacial terrain, no effort was made to extend the ceasefire line between NJ9842 and the China border. This area, of the Siachen Glacier, eventually became a bone of contention between India and Pakistan.

Another anomaly arose at the southern end of the ceasefire line in Jammu. From the terminus of the ceasefire line to the international boundary between Indian and Pakistani Punjab, there was a gap of over 200 km, which was covered by a recognised "provincial boundary" between Pakistani Punjab and the princely state of Jammu and Kashmir. India generally referred to this boundary as the "international border", whereas Pakistan referred to it as the "border" or the "working border".

Map of the Agreement
U.N. document number S/1430/Add.2 (which is the second addendum to the 1949 Karachi Agreement) shows the Cease Fire Line (CFL) marked on the Map of the State of Jammu and Kashmir. Title of this addendum reads:

Map of the State of Jammu and Kashmir showing the Cease Fire Line as Agreed Upon in the Karachi Agreement, Ratified by the Governments of India and Pakistan on 29 and 30 July Respectively. (See Annex 26 to the third Interim Report of the United Nation Commission for India and Pakistan)

U.N. Map illustrating Cease Fire Line as per Karachi Agreement 

The Karachi Agreement between India and Pakistan established a cease-fire line to be supervised by the military observers. These observers, under the command of the Military Advisor, formed the nucleus of the United Nations Military Observer Group in India and Pakistan (UNMOGIP). On 30 March 1951, following the termination of the United Nations Commission for India and Pakistan (UNCIP), the Security Council, by Resolution 91 (1951) decided that UNMOGIP should continue to supervise the cease-fire line in Kashmir. UNMOGIP's functions were to observe and report, investigate complaints of cease-fire violations and submit its findings to each party and to the Secretary-General.

See also
 NJ9842
 Simla Agreement
 United Nations Security Council Resolution 47
 Karachi Agreement (Azad Kashmir)

References

External links
Complete text of the agreement
Text of Agreement
Full text of the Karachi Agreement, UN Peacemaker
UN Map showing CFL as per Karachi Agreement - UN document number S/1430/Add.2, Dag Digital Library - the United Nations
UN Commission for India and Pakistan: annexes to the interim report, Annex 26
All peace agreement for India, UN Peacemaker
All peace agreements for Pakistan, UN Peacemaker

Bibliography 
 
 John Cherian, Spotlight on Siachen, Frontline, 17 July 1999

External links
 Karachi Agreement, United Nations Peacemaker website.

Peace treaties of Pakistan
Peace treaties of India
Treaties involving territorial changes
Diplomacy regarding the Kashmir conflict
India–Pakistan relations
1949 in India
1949 in Pakistan
Treaties concluded in 1949
Treaties entered into force in 1949
Treaties of the Dominion of India
India–Pakistan treaties
Government of Liaquat Ali Khan